Men's 50 metre running target made its final Olympic appearance at the 1988 Summer Olympics (after which it was replaced by 10 metre running target). It was also the only time the 30 slow runs and 30 fast runs were followed by a ten-shot final (fast runs) for the top four contestants. Gennadi Avramenko and Tor Heiestad established a new Olympic record of 591 points, and Heiestad won the final, where Avramenko was also surpassed by Huang Shiping.

Qualification round

OR Olympic record – Q Qualified for final

Final

OR Olympic record

References

Sources

 

Shooting at the 1988 Summer Olympics
Men's events at the 1988 Summer Olympics